Ernie Butler (died August 29, 2007) was a stand-up comedian and comedy impresario in Montreal, Quebec for 30 years.  

He was the proprietor of the Comedy Nest at the Pepsi Forum, and supported top-notch skill from the time he started Stitches on Crescent Street in 1979. Butler was the presenter of The CJAD Comedy Hour on AM radio and also co-hosted that station's Irish Show.

Butler was a supporter of charities, often lending his club for fund-raising  events.

Personal life

Butler overcame his compulsions (illicit drugs and alcohol) and supported others in their efforts to do so.

He died of stomach cancer August 29, 2007, after a short illness.  He is survived by his wife Marie and three children, Silver, Ryan, and Shannon.

Year of birth missing
2007 deaths
Canadian male comedians
Comedians from Montreal
Anglophone Quebec people
Deaths from stomach cancer
Place of birth missing